for the mountain range in San Bernardino County, California.
The Gravel Range is a mountain range in Tuolumne County, California.

References 

Mountain ranges of Northern California
Mountain ranges of Tuolumne County, California